Heterodera is a genus of nematodes in the family Heteroderidae. Members of the genus are obligate parasites and different species attack different crops, often causing great economic damage. The genus is unique among nematode genera because of the ability of the female to transform into a tough, brown, cyst which protects the eggs which have been formed within her body. The name heterodera "refers to the different 'skins' of female and cyst."

Diversity
The following is a list of taxa in the genus Heterodera:
 Heterodera amygdali
 Heterodera arenaria
 Heterodera aucklandica
 Heterodera avenae
 Heterodera bergeniae
 Heterodera bifenestra
 Heterodera cacti
 Heterodera cajani
 Heterodera canadensis
 Heterodera cardiolata
 Heterodera carotae
 Heterodera ciceri
 Heterodera cruciferae
 Heterodera delvii
 Heterodera elachista
 Heterodera filipjevi
 Heterodera gambiensis
 Heterodera glycines, soybean cyst nematode
 Heterodera goettingiana
 Heterodera hordecalis
 Heterodera humuli
 Heterodera latipons
 Heterodera longicaudata
 Heterodera medicaginis, alfalfa cyst nematode
 Heterodera oryzae
 Heterodera oryzicola
 Heterodera rosii
 Heterodera sacchari
 Heterodera schachtii
 Heterodera tabacum
 Heterodera trifolii
 Heterodera ustinovi
 Heterodera zeae, corn cyst nematode

Genetics 
GenBank contains internal transcribed spacers sequences for the family, much of which is for this genus. Most of that has been generated by Sergei Subbotin and collaborators (Subbotin et al 1999, Clapp et al 2000, Subbotin et al 2000, Zeng et al 2000, Subbotin et al 2001, Amiri & Subbotin 2002, Subbotin et al 2003). Subbotin et al 2003 suggests further analysis of this data will yield a large number of new Heterodera species.

References

External links

 
Tylenchida
Plant pathogenic nematodes
Secernentea genera